Guido Mannari (13 December 1944 Castiglioncello — 10 August 1988 Castiglioncello ) was an Italian actor of film and television.

Life and career 
Guido was born in Castiglioncello, Province of Livorno into a large family. He had three half-brothers. His father was a farmer, who worked on a local farm. His mother was one of the most beautiful women in the town. Before starting his acting career, Mannari was a semi-professional soccer player and played for his local team. He was a fullback at Unione Sportiva Città di Pontedera.

Guido Mannari moved to Rome at young age and decided to pursue a career as an actor, inspired by the movie Il sorpasso, which was filmed in Castiglioncello, his native town. After playing in the avant-garde theatre for a short time in the capital, he decided to go to the United States for year in order to master his future profession.

Spending a year in America, he returned back to Italy and made his first debut in Arabella, directed by Mauro Bolognini in 1967. Then he was chosen by the same director Bolognini to play a scene of rape in the Italian drama film L'assoluto naturale (internationally released as He and She and She and He), a scene that at the time raised a slight of controversities and launched his career. He was a model and had starred in fashion magazines. He also posed for Playmen and Party. 

Guido Mannari was in relationship with Elizabeth Taylor, with whom he got an acquaintance during the filming of the movie the Driver’s seat in 1974. But it was a brief love affair.

Later Mannari played a number of leading roles, but his career was mainly limited to conventional roles of handsome seducer. Towards the end of his life he became very religious. He became a member of Jehovah's Witnesses. Guido Mannari died from a heart attack at the age of 43 in Castiglioncello.

Filmography
Guido appeared in 20 movies. Here is the list of them:

See also

 List of Italian actors

References

External links 
 

1944 births
1988 deaths
20th-century Italian male actors
Italian male film actors
Italian male television actors
People from the Province of Livorno